Jenever, also known as Hollands, genever, genièvre, peket, or sometimes as Dutch gin (archaic: Holland gin or Geneva gin), is the juniper-flavored traditional liquor in the Netherlands, Belgium and adjoining areas in northern France and northwestern Germany. As an EU and UK Protected Designation of Origin the use of the term jenever and its soundalikes can only be used if the product is made according to the specifications in Belgium, the Netherlands, two northern French departments and two German federal states. Gin was developed in Britain after introduction of jenever to the island.

History
Jenever was originally produced by distilling malt wine (moutwijn in Dutch) to 50% alcohol by volume. Because the resulting spirit was not palatable due to the lack of refined distilling techniques (with only the pot still being available), herbs were added to mask the flavour. The juniper berry (which comes from the Latin juniperus), hence the name jenever (and the English name gin), was used for its alleged medicinal benefits.

The first written references to genever (or jenever) are found in scientific papers written by several Flemish authors. Jacob van Maerlant (Bruges, 1235 – 1300) described how to add parts of the juniper tree to a spirit made of distilling wine in his book Der Naturen Bloeme, published in 1266. It was the first writing of distilling in Dutch and had to do with the juniper tree. Later on, in 1522, the Antwerp based doctor Phillipus Hermanni wrote a first recipe of genever. He described how to mix crushed juniper berries with wine and to distill it afterwards. The very first versions of genever were being made for medical purposes and came from distilled wine. Later on, when cold periods drove out the vineyards in Flanders, it was replaced by distilling beer calling it malt wine. 

There is tradition that attributes the invention of jenever to the Dutch chemist and alchemist Franciscus Sylvius de Bouve (1614–1672). However, the evidence suggests that jenever was already known and used as a medicine in the 1500s. Already by 1606 (several years before Sylvius's birth), the Dutch had levied taxes on jenever and similar liquors as alcoholic drinks, suggesting that jenever had by then stopped being considered a medicinal remedy. Furthermore, prior to Sylvius's tenth birthday, jenever appeared in Philip Massinger's 1623 play, The Duke of Milan, which referred to the drink as "geneva". Geneva was the Anglicized name for jenever (even though the drink has no relation to the Swiss city of Geneva), a name that English soldiers had brought back with them when returning from battle in the Low Countries, first in 1587 (well before Sylvius's birth) and again during the early 1600s.

Since the 1950s, Dutch flag carrier airline KLM has issued a series of Delft Blue houses modelled on buildings in the Netherlands filled with jenever, which are presented to passengers.

Old and young
There are two types of jenever: oude (old) and jonge (young). This is not a matter of aging, but of distilling techniques. Around 1900, it became possible to distill a high-grade type of alcohol almost neutral in taste, independent of the origin of the spirit. A worldwide tendency for a lighter and less dominant taste, as well as lower prices, led to the development of blended whisky in Scotland, and in the Netherlands to Jonge Jenever. During World War I, the lack of imported cereals – and hence malt – forced the promotion of this blend. Alcohol derived from molasses from the sugar beet industry was used as an alternative to grain spirit. People started using the term oude for the old-style jenever, and jonge for the new style, which contains more grain instead of malt and can even contain plain sugar-based alcohol.

In modern times, jenever distilled from grain and malt only is labelled Graanjenever. Jonge jenever can contain no more than 15% malt wine and 10 grams of sugar per litre. Oude jenever must contain at least 15% malt wine, but no more than 20 g of sugar per litre. Korenwijn (grain wine) is a drink very similar to the 18th-century-style jenever, and is often matured for a few years in an oak cask; it contains from 51% to 70% malt wine and up to 20 g/L of sugar. Although the name oude jenever does not necessarily mean that the jenever is in fact old, there are some distilleries that age their jenever in oak barrels.

About 90% of all Jonge Jenever sold on the market is a blend from malt wine produced by Filliers in Belgium, sugar beet or grain based ethyl alcohol from factories in Germany, France and (mostly) Russia, and water. Most of the bigger brands contain no malt wine, so resemble in essence vodka. Distilleries in Belgium and the Netherlands actually distilling jenever mostly produce limited volumes of specialty drinks.

Taste
Jonge jenever has a neutral taste, like vodka, with a slight aroma of juniper and malt wine. Oude jenever has a smoother, very aromatic taste with malty flavours. Oude jenever is sometimes aged in wood; its malty, woody and smoky flavours resemble whisky.
Different grains used in the production process – such as barley, wheat, spelt and rye – produce different flavoured jenevers. The taste is sometimes enhanced by adopting barrels previously used for American whiskey.

Jenever cities

Hasselt, Deinze, Aalst and Liège in Belgium, and Schiedam, Groningen, Amsterdam and Delft in the Netherlands, are well known for their jenevers and often referred to as "jenever cities" (jeneversteden). In Amsterdam, jenever is made by The Stillery, Van Wees and Wynand Fockink. Well-known Schiedam jenever distilleries include Nolet, Onder De Boompjes, Pit and De Kuyper. (Jenever can appear under the English-language name "schiedam".) Near the Dutch-Belgian border, in Baarle-Nassau, Zuidam produces traditional jenevers and Dutch liquors. Other jenever-cities in the Netherlands are Groningen (Hooghoudt) and Dordrecht (Rutte Distillery). Hasselt styles itself Belgium's jenever capital, and has a museum dedicated to the drink. Also with the Biercée Distillery in Wallonia, one of only two Belgian distilleries to export their genever to the USA.

Dutch-based Lucas Bols produces and sells oude genever, known as ginebra in Spanish, in South America. Ketel One is now more known for producing vodka, but started out as, and still is, a jenever distillery.

Drinking traditions
Traditionally the drink is served in a tulip-shaped glass filled to the brim, with the surface tension enabling the jenever to rise higher than the glass's edge. Jonge jenever, colloquially a jonkie ("young'un"), is usually served at room temperature, sometimes (though this is now quite old fashioned) with some sugar and a tiny spoon to stir. The drink is sometimes served cold from a bottle kept in a freezer or on the rocks (jonge met ijs). The higher-quality oude jenever (and korenwijn) is usually served at room temperature. When jenever is drunk alongside beer (normally lager) as a chaser, it is referred to as a kopstoot (headbutt), when the glass of jenever is dipped into the beer glass it is called a duikboot (submarine) in Flanders and the South of Holland. Traditionally, jenever is served in full shot glasses taken directly from the freezer. As the glass is very full it is advisable to take the first sips without holding the glass, leaving it on the table and bending one's back to apply one's mouth to the glass.

Geographical indications
Recognized for its historic and cultural contribution, and subject to production specifications, the European Union protected genever with 11 specific types of jenever as a geographical indication:

 Belgium, the Netherlands, small parts of France, and small parts of Germany: genever (Genièvre / Jenever / Genever), grain genever (Genièvre de grains / Graanjenever / Graangenever)
 Belgium, the Netherlands, small parts of Germany: Genièvre aux fruits / Vruchtenjenever / Jenever met vruchten / Fruchtgenever
 Belgium and the Netherlands: old genever (oude jenever / oude genever), young genever (jonge jenever / jonge genever)
 Belgium: O'de Flander real East-Flemish grain genever (O'de Flander Echte Oost-Vlaamse graanjenever), Hasselt genever (Hasseltse jenever), Balegem genever (Balegemse jenever), and the Walloon peket (Peket-Pekêt / Pèket-Pèkèt de Wallonie)
 Two provinces of France: Flanders Artois genever (genièvre Flandre Artois)
 Two states of Germany: East-Frisia cereal grain genever (Ostfriesischer Korngenever)

The names Genièvre and Genièvre de Jura are also protected geographical indications of Switzerland (recognised in the EU). 

Protection as a geographical indication of Jenever also applies in Armenia, China, Georgia, Iceland, Kosovo, Liechtenstein, Mexico, Moldova, Norway, Switzerland, Ukraine, the United Kingdom and Japan.

References

External links
 

Belgian distilled drinks
Belgian inventions
Dutch distilled drinks
Dutch inventions